"Dubai Inc." is a phrase used to describe a collection of diverse companies owned primarily by the government of Dubai. These state-controlled investment properties grew from what was just a vision of Sheik Mohammed bin Rashid Al Maktoum's predecessors in the year 2000. Since then, the ruling family has selected leading figures to "take over what proved to be one of the most extraordinary success stories in global investment and development." Some examples of local companies under Dubai Inc. include Dubai World, Dubai Holdings, Emirates, and investment subsidiaries under Dubai World, such as Dubai Ports World, Jebel Ali Freezone, Nakheel, P&O Ferries, and others.

History 

Dubai, established in the early 19th century, is one of the seven emirates that form the United Arab Emirates.

Despite being along the eastern edge of the Arabian Peninsula, Dubai is located halfway between the financial capitals of London and Singapore, giving it access to a vast number of people within a short distance.[1] Due to this business environment, Dubai is an attractive host for multinational corporations, helping it to transform into the Singapore of the Middle East from just a spit of sand along the Persian Gulf.

Perhaps the start of Dubai Inc. dates back to as early as 1985. The prince, having recently had his flight canceled at the last minute, called Maurice Flanagan, demanding to know how much it would cost to start up his own airline. "Ten million dollars," replied the Brit. ([2] The first plane took off in the same year, and Emirates Airlines now has a fleet size of over 230 aircraft, flies to over 140 destinations in 80 countries, and has over 1500 planes departing from Dubai every day, earning it its 5th spot on the list of the world's best airlines. [3]

The prince behind this movement was one of the most, if not the most, influential visionaries in the formation of Dubai Inc., Mohammed bin Rashid Al Maktoum. Known by his people as "the boss," Sheik Mohammed assumed practical control of Dubai in 1995. ([4] Aside from Emirates, Sheik Mohammed has refashioned Dubai by increasing tourism, finance, and media related businesses. Along with Sultan Ahmed Bin Sulayem, who was placed in charge of Dubai Ports (DP) and Mohammed Al Gergawi, who took over Dubai Holdings, the three individuals collectively went to work on transforming Dubai.

Companies under Dubai Inc. 
Dubai Inc. looks over a vast network of local and state-owned companies. Some of the biggest organizations under Dubai Inc. include Dubai World, Dubai Holdings, and the Investment Corporation of Dubai (ICD).

Dubai World

Dubai World is a global holding company that focuses its efforts on areas of strategic growth. These areas include transport and logistics; urban development; dry-docks and maritime; and investment and financial services.

Consequently, Dubai World is the parent company of several subsidiaries, including:

 Dubai Drydocks is the Middle East's largest shipyard facility [1].

 Dubai Ports World is a maritime company that owns over 65 marine terminals on over 6 continents.

 Istithmar World is a Dubai-based investment firm.

 Leisurecorp: an investment firm specializing in sports and leisure facilities, with golf being a primary focus.

 Maritime City: an organization involved in ship repair, conversion, shipbuilding, maritime cluster and offshore.

 Nakheel is a real estate developer in Dubai, responsible for the construction of the Palm Islands, Dubai Waterfront, The World, and The Universe Islands.

 P & O Ferries: One of Europe's leading ferry operators involved in freight and travel.

 Tamweel is a real estate developer based in Dubai.

Dubai Holding

Dubai Holding was established in 2004, and is a global investment holding company with interest in 24 countries. Dubai Holding employs over 20,000 people and is managed through the Dubai Holding Commercial Operations Group (DHCOG), and the Dubai Holding Investment Group (DHIG). While DHCOG manages hospitality, real estate and telecommunications, DHIG manages the financial assets of Dubai Holding. These assets include investments and diversified financial services.

 DHCOG
 Dubai Properties Group - A developer of locations that support the long-term development of Dubai, including destinations such as Business Bay, DubaiLand, The Walk at JBR and Culture Village. Through its business units, Dubai Properties (DP) and Ejadah, the Dubai Properties Group also provides property related services such as project development and portfolio and asset management.
 Emirates International Telecommunications - An organization that invests in communications in the Middle East, North Africa, and Europe.
 Jumeirah Group - luxury hotels and resorts.
 TECOM Group - Formerly known as TECOM Investments, TECOM Group is a developer and operator of business communities that make a contribution to Dubai's sustainable economic growth. Through these communities, the company has provided a location for over 4,600 business, representing a total workforce of 74,000.
 DHIG
 Dubai Group - Established in the year 2000, Dubai Group is a company focused on financial services such as banking, investments and insurance on local and global scales. Through various affiliates, Dubai Group operates in the Middle East and North Africa region, European Union, North America, and Asia.
 Dubai International Capital - An investment company which primarily focuses on private equity in the Middle East and Western Europe.

Investment Corporation of Dubai (ICD)

The Investment Corporation of Dubai (ICD) was formed in 2006 in order to consolidate and manage the Dubai's portfolio with the aim of developing and implementing government policies and investment strategies to maximize shareholder value and benefit Dubai in the long term. ICD has a portfolio that is representative of sectors that are deemed ‘strategic’ for the continued development of Dubai. Strategic sectors include Financial and Investment, Transportation, Energy and Industrial, Real Estate and Leisure and Other Holdings.

 Finance and Investment
 Borse Dubai - “Borse Dubai is the holding company for Dubai Financial Market (DFM) and NASDAQ Dubai”.
 Dubai Investments - An investment company listed on the Dubai Financial Market (DFM). Dubai Investments has over 19,800 shareholders and a paid-up capital of AED 4 billion.
 Dubai Islamic Bank - An Islamic bank established in 1975 that is tasked with managing assets over US$1 trillion globally.
 Emirates NBD - A bank formed in 2007 when its shares were officially listed on the DFM.
 Others - Commercial Bank of Dubai, National Bonds, Noor Bank, Union National Bank, National Bank of Fujairah, Emirates Investment and Development, HSBC Middle East Finance Company, and Galadari Brothers Group.
 Transportation
 Dnata - A combined air services provider with over 23,000 employees from 38 countries.
 Dubai Aerospace Enterprise (DAE) - An aerospace company that provides aircraft leasing, repair, maintenance and overhaul services. 
 Emirates Group - An international aviation company in charge of Emirates Airline, Marhaba, Skywards, and many other subsidiaries.
 Energy and Industrial
 Cleveland Bridge and Engineering ME (CBEME) - A global leader in technology based engineering, construction and steel fabrication. CBME was founded in 1977 as a subsidiary of Cleveland Bridge & Engineering Company.
 Dubai Cable Company - A cable manufacturing company.
 Emirates Global Aluminium (EGA) - An aluminium conglomerate with interests in bauxite and primary aluminium smelting. 
 Emirates National Oil Company (ENOC) - The main energy group for the Dubai Government.
 Real Estate and Leisure
 Emaar - A world leading real estate and development company.
 Atlantis The Palm - A 5 star hotel and amusement park located on the Palm.
 Dubai Airport Free Zone (DAFZA) - Established in 1966, the free zone is located near Dubai International Airport.
 Dubai World Trade Centre - A complex built for hosting events and exhibitions, responsibly largely for the growth of international trade in the Middle East.
 Others - Golf in Dubai, and Dubai Silicon Oasis Authority.
 Other Holdings
 Aswaaq - A local shopping mall.
 Dubai Duty Free Establishment - The largest airport retailer in the world, employing over 5,600 people and receiving over 480 rewards for its success.
 Emartech - The “leading technology and consulting company in the Arab World”.
 Emirates Rawabi - Established in they year 2000, Rawabi is UAE's leading poultry and dairy producer.
 Others - Emirates Refreshments Company.

Problems and controversies

Open and Fair Skies 

Being a subsidiary of Dubai Inc., there is a major controversy regarding the Partnership for Open and Fair Skies. More specifically the “big three” US airlines, Delta, United Airlines and American Airlines, believe that Qatar Airways, Etihad Airways and Emirates, are receiving billions of dollars worth of government subsidies to aid them in the growing airline industry. In terms of Emirates specifically, the “coordination between Emirates and its government owner, the Emirate of Dubai, is particularly brazen.”

US airlines' argument 

The ownership of Emirates by the Dubai government and the system of Dubai Inc. enable Emirates to operate in pursuit of its governments' own economic objectives, rather than by market forces like other commercial airlines.

A smaller example of this subsidy can be demonstrated through the recent TV commercial featuring Jennifer Aniston. This commercial, costing an estimated $20 million, depicts Jennifer attempting to locate the shower on a generic U.S. airlines flight. The three flight attendants laugh and tell her there are no showers on board. The scene cuts to Jennifer waking on the Emirates A380, describing her “nightmare” to the bartender while sipping a martini.

The video is only the tip of the iceberg when it comes to the amount of subsidies Emirates is receiving from the government “If you're Emirates, based in Dubai, you can install showers, butlers and bars on your A380s because your government owners deliver wheelbarrows of subsidy cash”. Whereas American airlines such as American Airlines, Delta Airlines, United Airlines, or their European counterparts must take costs into consideration and spend prudently, as they themselves do not have access to state treasuries. Emirates has spent over $11 billion in the purchase of goods and services, $2.4 billion from government assumption of fuel hedging losses and $2.3 billion from subsidised airport infrastructure. This mass subsidising creates an increasingly tilted playing field in which airlines compete. Not to mention, it violates the provisions of the two “Open Skies” agreements, which allowed the UAS open access to the U.S. aviation market in exchange for fair competition, between the United States and the United Arab Emirates. This results in not only the violation of the agreement but also harms American jobs.

Emirates' argument 
Emirates has since responded to allegations of subsidies and unfair competition, claiming that the allegations of these three airlines are incorrect, and accusing them of having "launched an aggressive lobbying campaign in January, in a protectionist bid to restrict consumer choice, and restrict the growth of international flights to the USA operated by Emirates and other Gulf airlines." The airline denies that it has been subsidised, and the president of Emirates, Sir Tim Clark, stresses that Emirates has "been profitable for 27 years straight"  and, therefore, all subsequent growth has been sourced from the company's own cash flow. Instead of relying on unfair practices and government aid, Emirates argues that its success has been due to "superior commercial performance" and a revolutionary business model that takes advantage of Dubai's geographical location and long-haul flights. Emirates estimates that the total amount of government investment since its foundation has been $218 million, an amount that pales in comparison to the $6 billion accusation made by the US airlines. This amount is also negligible for a business that has earned $23.6 billion in revenue last year, and Emirates claims that the initial investment has been repaid many times over through dividends.

Furthermore, Clark argues that the US airlines have built their argument on the wrong legal standards, stating that the World Trade Organisation's anti-subsidy rules are not applicable to international aviation, nor are they incorporated in US Open Skies agreements, making their claims are fundamentally wrong. Clark argues that the US have "framed their complaint in terms of their own narrow interests" adding that their Open Skies agreements are favoured only when they "work to their financial advantage".

The president of Emirates concludes that "The [US airlines'] white paper is littered with self-serving rhetoric about fair trade, [a] level playing field, and saving jobs, but their mess of legal distortions and factual errors falls apart at the slightest scrutiny”.

The full report published by Emirates in rebuttal to the US airlines' accusation is a 400-page document, including detailed analysis and exhibits to support their case.

References

External links 
 Dubai Inc. on New York Times
 Dubai Inc. on Time
 Dubai Inc. on Wall Street Journal
 Dubai Inc., Part 1 - 60 Minutes - CBS News
 Dubai Inc., Part 2 - 60 Minutes - CBS News

Government-owned companies of the United Arab Emirates
Companies based in Dubai